South Santa Clara Valley is a census county division (CCD) located in south Santa Clara County, California. The area is bounded by Coyote to the north, Llagas-Uvas to the west, Diablo Range to the east, and San Benito County to the south.

As of the 2010 US Census, the population was 103,477 residents of whom 47.0% were Hispanic, 40.8% non-Hispanic white, 7.6% Asian, and 4.6% of other races, with a median age of 40.5 years old.

Most residents and businesses in the area use postal zip codes from neighboring cities of Morgan Hill, San Martin, and Gilroy.  The telephone area code is 408.

Climate

The region lies in the southern part of Santa Clara Valley, and supports a relatively mild Mediterranean climate.

References 

Unincorporated communities in Santa Clara County, California
Census county divisions in Santa Clara County, California
Unincorporated communities in California